James Freeman or Jim Freeman may refer to:

 James Freeman (clergyman) (1759–1835), American Unitarian clergyman
 James Freeman (conductor), American musical conductor
 James Freeman (cyclist) (1891–1951), American cyclist
 James Freeman (journalist), American
 James Freeman (swimmer) (born 2001), Botswana swimmer
 James C. Freeman (1820–1885), United States Congressman
 James Darcy Freeman (1907–1991), Catholic cardinal who was archbishop of Sydney
 James Dillet Freeman (1912–2003), Native American poet
 James E. Freeman (1866–1943), bishop of the Episcopal Diocese of Washington
 James Edward Freeman (1810–1884), American painter, diplomat and author
 James Garrett Freeman (1980–2016), American convicted murderer executed in Texas
 James M. Freeman (born 1936), American anthropologist
 James Midwinter Freeman (1827–1900), American clergyman
 James Stanley Freeman (1874–1960), Alabama millionaire
 James Shepherd Freeman (1900–1962), his son, World War II admiral in the United States Navy
 James W. Freeman (1842–1895), Republican member of the Wisconsin State Assembly
 Jim Freeman (American football) (1914–2015), Ball State University head football coach from 1956 to 1961
 Jim Freeman (Australian footballer) (1889–1956), Australian rules footballer
 Jim Freeman (died 1976), MacGillivray Freeman Films
 James Freeman Clarke (1810–1888), American theologian and author

See also 

 James Freedman (disambiguation)